This is a list of television dramas broadcast by Vietnam Television (VTV), including award ceremonies. Dramas broadcast but not produced by the television station are displayed smaller or excluded from the list depending on the time slot it aired.

SD Format

Without Prime-time 
During this stage, Vietnamese drama series did not air in certain prime time slot of its own but interleaved with foreign dramas series.  However, there was still a recurrent weekend afternoon time slot created in 1994 for Vietnamese dramas.

 List of VTV films broadcast in 1982-1993
 List of VTV dramas broadcast in 1994
 List of VTV dramas broadcast in 1995
 List of VTV dramas broadcast in 1996
 List of VTV dramas broadcast in 1997
 List of VTV dramas broadcast in 1998
 List of VTV dramas broadcast in 1999
 List of VTV dramas broadcast in 2000
 List of VTV dramas broadcast in 2001
 List of VTV dramas broadcast in 2002
 List of VTV dramas broadcast in 2003
 List of VTV dramas broadcast in 2004
 List of VTV dramas broadcast in 2005
 List of VTV dramas broadcast in 2006

With Prime-time
Under the effect of 2007 Cinema Law, VTV opened the prime time slot for Vietnamese dramas. The VTV1 and VTV3 prime time slots was launched on 20 September 2007 and 11 February 2008, respectively.

 List of VTV dramas broadcast in 2007
 List of VTV dramas broadcast in 2008
 List of VTV dramas broadcast in 2009
 List of VTV dramas broadcast in 2010
 List of VTV dramas broadcast in 2011
 List of VTV dramas broadcast in 2012

HD Format
An HD version of VTV3 was launched on 31 March 2013. This channel is the first channel in VTV to broadcast in High Definition.

Following that, HD versions of VTV6 and VTV1 was launched on 7 September 2013 and 31 March 2014, respectively.

The other VTV channels' HD versions was launched in 2015.

 List of VTV dramas broadcast in 2013
 List of VTV dramas broadcast in 2014
 List of VTV dramas broadcast in 2015
 List of VTV dramas broadcast in 2016
 List of VTV dramas broadcast in 2017
 List of VTV dramas broadcast in 2018
 List of VTV dramas broadcast in 2019
 List of VTV dramas broadcast in 2020
 List of VTV dramas broadcast in 2021
 List of VTV dramas broadcast in 2022
 List of VTV dramas broadcast in 2023

Sitcoms

 Nhật ký Vàng Anh (Vàng Anh Diary; 2006-2007 | VTV3)
 Nhật ký Vàng Anh 2 (Vàng Anh Diary 2; 2007 | VTV3)
 Bộ tứ 10A8 (The Four of 10A8; 2009-2012|VTV3)
 Những phóng viên vui nhộn (Hilarious Reporters; 2010-2012 | VTV3)
 Camera công sở (The Office Camera; 2010-2011 | VTV3)
 Cửa số thủy tinh (Crystal Window; 2012-2013 | VTV3)
 5S Online (2013-2016 | VTV6)
 Tiệm bánh hoàng tử bé (Little Prince Bakery; 2013-2015 | VTV9)
 Gái ngoan truyền kỳ (Myth of Good Girls; 2013-2015 | VTV3)
 Sắc màu phái đẹp (Colors of the Fairs; 2014-2020 | VTV3)
 Phụ nữ là số 1 (Women is Number 1; 2014–present | VTV3)
 Bótay.kom (2015-2018 | VTV3-VTV6)
 Yêu là phải lấy (Marry Who You Love; 2016 | VTV3)
 Làm giàu cực khó (Getting Rich Is So Hard; 2016 | VTV3)
 Nhà nông vui vẻ (Happy Farmers; 2017–present | VTV2-VTV3)
 Chung cư loạn truyện (Apartment's Hysterical Stories; 2017-2018 | VTV3)
 Cư dân thông thái (Knowledgeable Residents; 2017-2018 | VTV6)
 Gia đình 4.0 (The 4.0 Family; 2018-2020 | VTV2)
 Đen thôi, đỏ quên đi (Just Bad Luck, Don't Mind; 2018-2019 | vtvgiaitri-VTV3)
 Thả thính là dính (Clickbait; 2019 | vtvgiaitri-VTV3)
 Những thiên thần nhà S6 (Angels in Apartment S6; 2019 | vtvgiaitri-VTV3)
 Làm giàu không khó (Getting Rich Is Not So Hard; 2020 | VTV3)
 Ba chàng ngốc (Three Idiots; 2020 | VTV2)
 Góc phố muôn màu (Colorful Street Corner; 2020–present | VTV3)
 Khu dân cư rắc rối (Troubled Neighbors; 2020 | VTV3)
 Hoa nắng vùng cao (Highlands Sunshine; 2021 | VTV5)
 Kỳ nghỉ trên bản Leng Keng (The Vacation on Leng Keng Village; 2021 | VTV5)

Awards

Awards for "The Most Beloved VTV Dramas" Voting Contest
Starting in 2003, The Most Beloved Vietnam Television Dramas' Voting Contest (Vietnamese: Cuộc thi bình chọn phim truyền hình Việt Nam được yêu thích nhất) is held annually or biennially by VTV Television Magazine to honor Vietnamese television dramas broadcast during the year(s) on two channels VTV1-VTV3.

VTV Awards
VTV Awards (Vietnamese: Ấn tượng VTV) is an annual awards ceremony, launched in 2014, to honour remarkable programmes and figures who appeared on Vietnam Television (VTV) channels during the year (from last August to next July). The winners will be determined by audiences’ votes on the official website of the awards, http://www.antuong.vtv.vn, and the jury's scores.

Impressive Drama Awards

Impressive Actor/Actress Awards

{| class="wikitable" rowspan=2 style="text-align: center; width:100%;" border="2" cellpadding="4"
|-
!scope="col" style="width:8%;"| Ceremony
!scope="col" style="width:46%;"| Winning & Nominated Actor
!scope="col" style="width:46%;"| Winning & Nominated Actress
|-
| rowspan=6 style="text-align:center"| 2015
|- style="background:#FAEB86"
| Kang Tae-oh (as Junsu in Tuổi thanh xuân)
| Nhã Phương (as Thùy Linh in Tuổi thanh xuân)
|-
| Hồng Đăng (as Khánh in Tuổi thanh xuân)
| Shin Hye-sun (as Miso in Tuổi thanh xuân)
|-
| M.A. Trọng Trinh (as Tài in Mưa bóng mây)
| Thúy Hà (as Bích in Mưa bóng mây)
|-
| Huy Khánh (as Hải in Đam mê nghiệt ngã)
| Phan Minh Huyền (as Lan in Lời thì thầm từ quá khứ & Linh in Trái tim có nắng)
|-
| Đỗ Duy Nam (as Thắng in Sóng ngầm)
| P.A. Như Quỳnh (as Mrs. Mai in Sóng ngầm)
|-
| rowspan=6 style="text-align:center"| 2016
|- style="background:#FAEB86"
| Hồng Đăng (as Huy in Zippo, mù tạt và em)
| Nhã Phương (as Yến Phương in Khúc hát mặt trời & young Lam in Zippo, mù tạt và em)
|-
| Chí Nhân (as Khang in Hôn nhân trong ngõ hẹp,Linh "đù" in Cảnh sát hình sự: Câu hỏi số 5 & Khắc Đức in Lựa chọn cuối cùng)
| Diễm Hương (as Hằng in Hôn nhân trong ngõ hẹp)
|-
| Việt Anh (as Thành in Khi đàn chim trở về 3)
| Ninh Dương Lan Ngọc (as Mỹ Khanh in Nguyệt thực)
|-
| Mạnh Trường (as Hữu Khánh in Người đứng trong gió & Sơn in Zippo, mù tạt và em)
| Cao Thái Hà (as Kim Oanh in Đồng tiền quỷ ám)
|-
| Bình Minh (as Quốc in Những ngọn nến trong đêm 2)
| Mai Thu Huyền (as Trúc in Những ngọn nến trong đêm 2)
|-
| rowspan=6 style="text-align:center"| 2017
|- style="background:#FAEB86"
| P.A. Hoàng Dũng(as Phan Quân in Người phán xử)
| Bảo Thanh(as Minh Vân in Sống chung với mẹ chồng & Quỳnh in Hợp đồng hôn nhân)
|-
| Kang Tae-oh (as Junsu in Tuổi thanh xuân 2)
| Nhã Phương (as Thùy Linh in Tuổi thanh xuân 2)
|-
| Bảo Anh (as Bảo "ngậu" in Người phán xử)
| Thanh Hương (as Phan Hương in Người phán xử)
|-
| Hồng Đăng (as Minh in Mátxcơva - Mùa thay lá & Lê Thành in Người phán xử)
| Hồng Diễm (as Phương in Mátxcơva - Mùa thay lá)
|-
| M.A. Trung Anh (as Lương 'Bổng' in Người phán xử)
| M.A. Kim Oanh (as Mai Hoa in Chiều ngang qua phố cũ)
|-
| rowspan=6 style="text-align:center"| 2018
|- style="background:#FAEB86"
| Hồng Đăng (as Phong in Cả một đời ân oán)
| Lan Phương (as Diệu in Cả một đời ân oán)
|-
| Mạnh Trường (as Thành in Ngược chiều nước mắt & Đăng in Cả một đời ân oán)
| Hồng Diễm (as Dung in Cả một đời ân oán)
|-
| Lê Vũ Long (as Quang in Tình khúc bạch dương)
| Thanh Hương (as Nương in Thương nhớ ở ai)
|-
| Nhan Phúc Vinh (as Tùng in Ngày ấy mình đã yêu)
| Nhã Phương (as Hạ in Ngày ấy mình đã yêu)
|-
| Chí Thiện (as Đô in Ngày ấy mình đã yêu)
| Bảo Thanh (as Sol in Ngày ấy mình đã yêu)
|-
| rowspan=6 style="text-align:center"| 2019
|- style="background:#FAEB86"
| P.A. Trung Anh (as Mr. Sơn in Về nhà đi con)
| Bảo Thanh (as Anh Thư in Về nhà đi con)
|-
| Huỳnh Anh (as Phi in Chạy trốn thanh xuân)
| Ninh Dương Lan Ngọc (as An Chi in Mối tình đầu của tôi)
|-
| Doãn Quốc Đam (as Cảnh in Quỳnh búp bê & Fedora/"Fotomat" Long Nhật in Cảnh sát hình sự: Mê cung)
| Thu Quỳnh (as My "sói" in Quỳnh búp bê & Thu Huệ in Về nhà đi con)
|-
| Hồng Đăng (as Major Nguyễn Minh Khánh in Cảnh sát hình sự: Mê cung)
| Thanh Hương (as Lan in Quỳnh búp bê & Linh in Nàng dâu order)
|-
| Quốc Trường (as Vũ in Về nhà đi con)
| Bảo Hân (as Ánh Dương in Về nhà đi con)
|-
| rowspan=6 style="text-align:center"| 2020
|- style="background:#FAEB86"
| Xuân Nghị (as Cao Minh Bách in Nhà trọ Balanha)
| Hồng Diễm (as Khuê in Hoa hồng trên ngực trái)
|-
| Thanh Sơn (as Duy in Đừng bắt em phải quên & Sơn in Tình yêu và tham vọng)
| Quỳnh Kool (as Ngọc in Đừng bắt em phải quên & Nhi in Nhà trọ Balanha)
|-
| Nhan Phúc Vinh (as Trần Nguyên Minh in Tình yêu và tham vọng)
| Diễm My (as Phan Hoàng Linh in Tình yêu và tham vọng)
|-
| Mạnh Trường (as Prosecutor Bùi Tiến Huy in Sinh tử & Kiều Phong in Tình yêu và tham vọng)
| Lã Thanh Huyền (as Tuệ Lâm in Tình yêu và tham vọng)
|-
| Việt Anh (as Mai Hồng Vũ in Sinh tử)
| Phương Oanh (as Uyên in Cô gái nhà người ta)
|-
| rowspan=6 style="text-align:center"| 2021
|- style="background:#FAEB86"
| Mạnh Trường (as Hải in Cảnh sát hình sự: Hồ sơ cá sấu & Long in Hương vị tình thân)
| Hồng Diễm (as Cao Minh Châu in Hướng dương ngược nắng)
|-
| Việt Anh (as Đặng Trung in Cảnh sát hình sự: Hồ sơ cá sấu & Hoàng in Hướng dương ngược nắng)
| Lương Thu Trang (as Cao Dương Minh in Hướng dương ngược nắng)
|-
| Hồng Đăng (as Kiên in Hướng dương ngược nắng)
| P.A. Thu Hà (as Mrs. Bạch Cúc in Hướng dương ngược nắng)
|-
| Thanh Sơn (as Thiên in Yêu hơn cả bầu trời)
| Thúy Diễm (as Nhớ in Cát đỏ)
|-
| Công Dương (as Phan in Hãy nói lời yêu)
| Tú Oanh (as Mrs. Bích in Hương vị tình thân)
|-
| rowspan=6 style="text-align:center"| 2022
|- style="background:#FAEB86"
| Thanh Sơn (as Hải Đăng in 11 tháng 5 ngày & Captain Lê Anh Vũ in Đấu trí)
| Phan Minh Huyền (as Vân Trang in Thương ngày nắng về)
|-
| Doãn Quốc Đam <small>(as Mến in Phố trong làng & Đông Phong in Thương ngày nắng về)
| Khả Ngân (as Tuệ Nhi in 11 tháng 5 ngày)
|-
| Nhan Phúc Vinh (as Tuấn Khang in Anh có phải đàn ông không)
| Hồng Diễm (as Phương in Hành trình công lý)
|- 
| Đình Tú (as Hoàng Duy in Thương ngày nắng về)
| Ngọc Lan <small>(as Ngọc Diễm in Cảnh sát hình sự: Mặt nạ gương & Hồng in Mẹ rơm)</small>
|- 
| Bảo Anh (as Captain Nghiêm Đức Tùng in Cảnh sát hình sự: Mặt nạ gương & Khải in Ga-ra hạnh phúc)
| Quỳnh Kool (as Vy in Anh có phải đàn ông không & Sơn Ca in Ga-ra hạnh phúc)
|}

 Note: P.A. is short for People's Artist, M.A. is short for Merited Artist''. These titles are granted to certain Vietnamese artists by the Government.

See also 
List of dramas broadcast by Hanoi Radio Television (HanoiTV)
List of dramas broadcast by Vietnam Digital Television (VTC)
List of television programmes broadcast by Vietnam Television (VTV)

References

External links 
VTV.gov.vn – Official VTV Website 
VTV.vn – Official VTV Online Newspaper 
antuong.vtv.vn - Official VTV Awards Website 

Vietnam Television original programming
Vietnam Television (VTV)
VTV